SM City Davao, also known locally as "SM Ecoland", is an indoor shopping mall in Quimpo Boulevard, Matina, Davao City, Philippines. SM Prime Holdings developed and manages the mall. It is the first SM Mall in the Mindanao region, opening to the public on November 17, 2001.

Location

Floor space expanded to cover  after the opening of The Annex on March 9, 2012. The mall is at Quimpo Boulevard. A transportation terminal constructed beside the mall accommodates visitors.

Physical details

Main Mall
The Main Mall is a 3-level square-shaped building with anchor tenants The SM Store and SM Supermarket It also features six digital cinemas. It has many local and international store brands along with the old Entertainment Center, and the former Cyberzone. A passport office of the Department of Foreign Affairs occupies  of space at the mall's third level which opened in September 2012.

The Annex
The Annex is an expansion building of SM City Davao. It has shops on its 1st and 2nd floors, while business process outsourcing facilities are on its 3rd and 4th floors.

Expansion Building 
In the first quarter of 2023, works began for an expansion building on the left side of the mall which was once a parking lot and a transport terminal.  It has an allotted budget of ₱775 Million.

Incidents

Annex Construction collapse incident
Five construction workers were removing the scaffolding of the cemented steel canopy when the canopy collapsed due to metal fatigue. The victims were Prudencio Custorio, Alvin Rapista, Ronie Mosqueda, Rogelio Piodo, and Ruel Inampas. They suffered bruises and wounds, and the rescue team brought them to the Southern Philippines Medical Center. Mayor Inday Sara Duterte ordered construction stopped during the investigation. The reason of the collapsed canopy was due to an error in construction method, according to Engineer Jaime Adalin, the chief of Davao City Building Office.

2013 Davao City bombings
The mall was subjected to one of the two terrorist bombings that occurred on September 17, 2013, the other one being at Gaisano Mall of Davao after the blast site. It happened during the time of armed crisis in Zamboanga City, which involved elements of the Moro National Liberation Front (MNLF); however, the MNLF Davao Regional Command denied that they were behind the bombings. The incident happened at the Cinema 1.

2019 earthquake
After the 2019 Davao del Sur earthquake, the mall building incurred damage, particularly at the top of Annex Building and the ceilings outside the mall collapsed. No deaths and injuries were reported.

References

External links
SM City Davao
Official Blog of SM City Davao

Shopping malls in Davao City
Shopping malls established in 2001
SM Prime